Marian X (born Marian Warrington in 1944) is an American playwright.

Life
Born in Trenton, New Jersey, Marian X and her sister were mostly raised by their father in Baltimore. After angry white men burned her father's delicatessen, the pair were placed with foster parents. She attended an integrated girls' high school, before studying English at Morgan State University.

She married, raising two children before taking a graduate degree in theatre from Villanova University and starting to write plays. She has also taught English at the G. W. Carver High School for Engineering and Science in Philadelphia.

Marian X's 1987 play Wet Carpets was a comedy with music about three women raised as sisters who go through mid life crisis. It was chosen by the Crossroads Theatre Company as the premiere production in 1988 for their New Play Rites series.

Plays
 Idella. First production, Villanova, Pennsylvania, 1983.
 Wet Carpets. First production, Theatre Center, Philadelphia, 1987.
 The Mayor's Wife. First production, Theatre Center, Philadelphia, 1990.
 Warrior Stance (or Sex, A Comedy). First production, Penumbra Theatre Workshop, Minneapolis, Minnesota, 1992.
 The Screened-in Porch. First production, Philadelphia Dramatists Center, Philadelphia, 1994.

Awards 
In 1997, Marian X received a fellowship from the Pew Charitable Trusts.

External links
 marianx.com

References

1944 births
Living people
American dramatists and playwrights
American women dramatists and playwrights
Morgan State University alumni
Villanova University alumni
African-American dramatists and playwrights
African-American women writers
Pew Fellows in the Arts
21st-century African-American people
20th-century African-American people
20th-century African-American women
21st-century African-American women